Matías Gutiérrez may refer to:

 Matías Gutiérrez (Argentine footballer) (born 1994), Argentine midfielder
 Matías Gutiérrez (Chilean footballer) (born 1994), Chilean defender